Hippocampus sarmaticus is an extinct species of seahorse, found in 2005 in the coprolitic horizon of the Tunjice hills Lagerstätte in Slovenia, along with the related Hippocampus slovenicus.

Taxonomy
The horizon dates 13 million years back to the lower Sarmatian during the middle Miocene period, making the two species the earlier known seahorse fossils in the world. Among the remains, one adult female specimen is fully preserved, with bony plates and other important macroscopic features. The rest are mostly juvenile specimens and remains of head and backbones of adults.

The animals are believed to have lived among seagrasses and macroalgae in the temperate shallow coastal waters of the western part of the central Paratethys.

References

Further reading
 Choi C. (May 4, 2009) "PHOTOS: Oldest Seahorses Found; Help Solve Mystery." National Geographic news.
 Žalohar J. Fossil seahorses  - treasure from the ancient seas.

sarmaticus
Miocene fishes of Europe
2005 in science
Fossil taxa described in 2009
Neogene fish of Europe
Prehistoric fish